GSAT-7R is a planned Indian military communication satellite for the Indian Navy to replace GSAT-7. The satellite is projected to cost ₹1,589 crores (US$225.5 million). It is expected to be launched by 2023.

See also 

 GSAT-7A
 GSAT
 Indian National Satellite System
 List of Indian satellites

References 

GSAT satellites
2023 in spaceflight
2023 in India